Stacey May Fowles (born 1979) is a Canadian writer.

Fowles first novel, Be Good, was published by Tightrope Books in 2007. In fall 2008 she released an illustrated novel, Fear of Fighting, and staged a theatrical adaptation of it with Nightwood Theatre. The novel was later selected as a National Post Canada Also Reads pick for 2010.

Her writing has appeared in various magazines and journals, including The Walrus, Taddle Creek, Prism, and Kiss Machine. She has been widely anthologize in Nobody Passes: Rejecting The Rules of Gender and Conformity; First Person Queer; Yes Means Yes; I.V. Lounge Nights; and PEN Canada's Finding The Words. Most recently, she co-edited the anthology She's Shameless: Women write about growing up, rocking out and fighting back.

Fowles writes for the National Post.

Bibliography

Books
Be Good. Toronto: Tightrope, 2007.
Fear of Fighting. Halifax: Invisible Publishing, 2008.
"Infidelity: A Novel". ECW Press, 2013.

External links
Stacey May Fowles's home page
"The Right Choice of Words", essay in National Post
Interview with Stacey May Fowles at BlogTO
"Stacey May Fowles locates a "silver lining" in the Davidar affair" in Quill and Quire
"The Unbalancing Act" in The Walrus Blog
Fear of Fighting on Amazon
Review of Be Good in Quill and Quire

Canadian feminist writers
Canadian women novelists
1979 births
Living people
21st-century Canadian novelists
21st-century Canadian women writers